In mathematics, Laplace's method, named after Pierre-Simon Laplace, is a technique used to approximate integrals of the form

where  is a twice-differentiable function, M is a large number, and the endpoints a and b could possibly be infinite.

In Bayesian statistics, Laplace's approximation can refer to either approximating the posterior normalizing constant with Laplace's method or approximating the posterior distribution with a Gaussian centered at the maximum a posteriori estimate. Laplace approximations play a central role in the integrated nested Laplace approximations method for fast approximate Bayesian inference.

The idea of Laplace's method

Suppose the function  has a unique global maximum at x0. Let  be a constant and consider the following two functions:

Now observe:

As M increases, the ratio for  will grow exponentially, while the ratio for  does not change. Thus, significant contributions to the integral of this function will come only from points x in a neighbourhood of x0, which can then be estimated.

General theory of Laplace's method
To state and motivate the method, we need several assumptions. We will assume that x0 is not an endpoint of the interval of integration, that the values  cannot be very close to  unless x is close to x0, and that 

We can expand  around x0 by Taylor's theorem,

where  (see: big O notation).

Since  has a global maximum at x0, and since x0 is not an endpoint, it is a stationary point, so the derivative of  vanishes at x0. Therefore, the function  may be approximated to quadratic order

for x close to x0 (recall ). The assumptions ensure the accuracy of the approximation

(see the picture on the right). This latter integral is a Gaussian integral if the limits of integration go from −∞ to +∞ (which can be assumed because the exponential decays very fast away from x0), and thus it can be calculated. We find

Formal statement and proof

Then:

Lower bound: Let . Since  is continuous there exists  such that if  then  By Taylor's Theorem, for any 

Then we have the following lower bound:

where the last equality was obtained by a change of variables

Remember  so we can take the square root of its negation.

If we divide both sides of the above inequality by

and take the limit we get:

since this is true for arbitrary  we get the lower bound:

Upper bound: The proof is similar to that of the lower bound but there are a few inconveniences.

Lastly, by our assumptions (assuming  are finite) there exists an  such that if , then .

Then we can calculate the following upper bound:

If we divide both sides of the above inequality by

and take the limit we get:

Since  is arbitrary we get the upper bound:

And combining this with the lower bound gives the result.

To deal with these cases, we need some extra assumptions. A sufficient (not necessary) assumption is that for 

and that the number  as above exists (note that this must be an assumption in the case when the interval  is infinite). The proof proceeds otherwise as above, but with a slightly different approximation of integrals:

When we divide by

we get for this term

The rest of the proof (the analysis of the interesting term) proceeds as above.

The given condition in the infinite interval case is, as said above, sufficient but not necessary. However, the condition is fulfilled in many, if not in most, applications: the condition simply says that the integral we are studying must be well-defined (not infinite) and that the maximum of the function at  must be a "true" maximum (the number  must exist). There is no need to demand that the integral is finite for  but it is enough to demand that the integral is finite for some 

This method relies on 4 basic concepts such as

1. Relative error
The “approximation” in this method is related to the relative error and not the absolute error. Therefore, if we set

the integral can be written as

where  is a small number when  is a large number obviously and the relative error will be
 

Now, let us separate this integral into two parts:  region and the rest.

2.  around the stationary point when  is large enough

Let’s look at the Taylor expansion of  around x0 and translate x to y because we do the comparison in y-space, we will get

Note that  because  is a stationary point. From this equation you will find that the terms higher than second derivative in this Taylor expansion is suppressed as the order of  so that  will get closer to the Gaussian function as shown in figure. Besides,

3.

4. If the integral in Laplace’s method converges, the contribution of the region which is not around the stationary point of the integration of its relative error will tend to zero as  grows.

Relying on the 3rd concept, even if we choose a very large Dy, sDy will finally be a very small number when  is increased to a huge number. Then, how can we guarantee the integral of the rest will tend to 0 when  is large enough?

The basic idea is to find a function  such that  and the integral of  will tend to zero when  grows. For simplicity, choose  as a tangent through the point  as shown in the figure:

If the interval of the integration of this method is finite, we will find that no matter  is continue in the rest region, it will be always smaller than  shown above when  is large enough. By the way, it will be proved later that the integral of  will tend to zero when  is large enough.

If the interval of the integration of this method is infinite,  and  might always cross to each other. If so, we cannot guarantee that the integral of  will tend to zero finally. For example, in the case of   will always diverge. Therefore, we need to require that  can converge for the infinite interval case.

You might ask that why not choose  as a convergent integral? Let me use an example to show you the reason. So, the integral of some functions will diverge when  is not a large number, but they will converge when  is large enough.

Based on these four concepts, we can derive the relative error of this Laplace's method.

Other formulations
Laplace's approximation is sometimes written as

where  is positive.

First, use  to denote the global maximum, which will simplify this derivation.

where

So, if we let

since .

For the upper bound, note that  thus we can separate this integration into 5 parts with 3 different types (a), (b) and (c), respectively. Therefore,

For , we can get

where

and  should have the same sign of  during this region.

From this figure you can find that when  or  gets smaller, the region satisfies the above inequality will get larger.

Based on Taylor expansion, we can get

and

Keeping them is better, but it will make the formula uglier.

Therefore, it will tend to zero when  gets larger, but don't forget that the upper bound of  should be considered during this calculation.

About the integration near , we can also use Taylor's Theorem to calculate it. When 

In fact,  will have the same behave when  is a constant.

So, the bigger  is, the bigger  can be.

Analogously to the univariate case, the Hessian is required to be negative definite.

By the way, although  denotes a -dimensional vector, the term  denotes an infinitesimal volume here, i.e. .

Laplace's method extension: Steepest descent

In extensions of Laplace's method, complex analysis, and in particular Cauchy's integral formula, is used to find a contour of steepest descent for an (asymptotically with large M) equivalent integral, expressed as a line integral. In particular, if no point x0 where the derivative of  vanishes exists on the real line, it may be necessary to deform the integration contour to an optimal one, where the above analysis will be possible. Again the main idea is to reduce, at least asymptotically, the calculation of the given integral to that of a simpler integral that can be explicitly evaluated. See the book of Erdelyi (1956) for a simple discussion (where the method is termed steepest descents).

The appropriate formulation for the complex z-plane is

for a path passing through the saddle point at z0. Note the explicit appearance of a minus sign to indicate the direction of the second derivative: one must not take the modulus. Also note that if the integrand is meromorphic, one may have to add residues corresponding to poles traversed while deforming the contour (see for example section 3 of Okounkov's paper Symmetric functions and random partitions).

Further generalizations
An extension of the steepest descent method is the so-called nonlinear stationary phase/steepest descent method. Here, instead of integrals, one needs to evaluate asymptotically solutions of Riemann–Hilbert factorization problems.

Given a contour C in the complex sphere, a function  defined on that contour and a special point, say infinity, one seeks a function M holomorphic away from the contour C, with prescribed jump across C, and with a given normalization at infinity. If  and hence M are matrices rather than scalars this is a problem that in general does not admit an explicit solution.

An asymptotic evaluation is then possible along the lines of the linear stationary phase/steepest descent method. The idea is to reduce asymptotically the solution of the given Riemann–Hilbert problem to that of a simpler, explicitly solvable, Riemann–Hilbert problem. Cauchy's theorem is used to justify deformations of the jump contour.

The nonlinear stationary phase was introduced by Deift and Zhou in 1993, based on earlier work of Its. A (properly speaking) nonlinear steepest descent method was introduced by Kamvissis, K. McLaughlin and P. Miller in 2003, based on previous work of Lax, Levermore, Deift, Venakides and Zhou. As in the linear case, "steepest descent contours" solve a min-max problem. In the nonlinear case they turn out to be "S-curves" (defined in a different context back in the 80s by Stahl, Gonchar and Rakhmanov).

The nonlinear stationary phase/steepest descent method has applications to the theory of soliton equations and integrable models, random matrices and combinatorics.

Laplace's method generalization: Median-point approximation

In the generalization, evaluation of the integral is considered equivalent to finding the norm of the distribution with density

Denoting the cumulative distribution , if there is a diffeomorphic Gaussian distribution with density

the norm is given by

and the corresponding diffeomorphism is

where  denotes cumulative standard normal distribution function.

In general, any distribution diffeomorphic to the Gaussian distribution has density

and the median-point is mapped to the median of the Gaussian distribution.

The approximation was introduced in 2019 by D. Makogon and C. Morais Smith primarily in the context of partition function evaluation for a system of interacting fermions.

Complex integrals
For complex integrals in the form:

with  we make the substitution t = iu and the change of variable  to get the bilateral Laplace transform:

We then split g(c + ix) in its real and complex part, after which we recover u = t/i. This is useful for inverse Laplace transforms, the Perron formula and complex integration.

Example: Stirling's approximation
Laplace's method can be used to derive Stirling's approximation

for a large integer N.

From the definition of the Gamma function, we have

Now we change variables, letting  so that  Plug these values back in to obtain

This integral has the form necessary for Laplace's method with

which is twice-differentiable:

The maximum of  lies at z0 = 1, and the second derivative of  has the value −1 at this point. Therefore, we obtain

See also

 Method of stationary phase
 Method of steepest descent
 Large deviations theory
 Laplace principle (large deviations theory)
 Laplace's approximation

Notes

References

.
.
.
.

Asymptotic analysis
Perturbation theory
Integral calculus